The State Policy Network (SPN) is a nonprofit organization that serves as a network for conservative and libertarian think tanks focusing on state-level policy in the United States. The network serves as a public policy clearinghouse and advises its member think tanks on fundraising, running a nonprofit, and communicating ideas. Founded in 1992, it is headquartered in Arlington, Virginia, with member groups located in all fifty states.

Overview
SPN describes itself as a "professional service organization" for a network of state-level think tanks across the United States. The president of SPN is Tracie Sharp, formerly the executive director of the Cascade Policy Institute, SPN's Oregon affiliate. She has described her organizing philosophy as "the IKEA model", because like a ready-to-assemble furniture retailer, the network offers a catalog of policy projects that state-level groups can build.

History
The State Policy Network was founded in 1992 by Thomas A. Roe, a South Carolina businessman who was a member of the board of trustees of The Heritage Foundation. Roe told U.S. President Ronald Reagan that he thought each of the states needed something like the Heritage Foundation. Reagan's reply was "do something about it," which led Roe to establish the South Carolina Policy Council (SCPC). SCPC adapted Heritage Foundation national policy recommendations, such as school choice and environmental deregulation, to the state legislative level.

SPN was an outgrowth of the Madison Group, a collection of state-level think tanks in states including South Carolina, Colorado, Illinois, and Michigan that had been meeting periodically at the Madison Hotel in Washington, D.C. Roe was chairman of the board of directors of SPN from its founding until his death in 2000. Gary Palmer, co-founder and president of the conservative think tank the Alabama Policy Institute from 1989 until 2014, helped found SPN and served as its president.

Initially, SPN's network consisted of fewer than 20 member organizations. Lawrence Reed, the first president of the Mackinac Center for Public Policy, a Michigan-based free market think tank, fostered new state-level regular member organizations through delivery of his think tank training course. By the mid-1990s, SPN had a network of 37 think tanks in 30 states. By 2014, there were 65 member organizations, including at least one in each state.

Starting in 1993, the SPN has held an annual meeting in various U.S. cities. These meetings serve as a chance for members to discuss and analyze policy priorities, train and build members, and refine operations, among other topics.

Policy positions
Policy initiatives supported by SPN members have included reductions in state health and welfare programs, state constitutional amendments to limit state government spending, expanded access to charter schools, and school vouchers. Another area of activity has been opposition to public-sector trade unions. Tracie Sharp, SPN's president, has said the organization focuses on issues such as "workplace freedom, education reform, and individual choice in healthcare."

The liberal magazine Mother Jones stated that in 2011 SPN and its member organizations were backing a "war on organized labor" by Republican state lawmakers. Legislative actions taken by the GOP included the introduction and enactment of bills reducing or eliminating collective bargaining for teachers and other government workers and reducing the authority of unions to collect dues from government employees. In Iowa, Governor Terry Branstad cited research by the Public Interest Institute, an SPN affiliate in Iowa, when asking to amend laws to limit collective bargaining by public employees.

In December 2013, The Guardian, in collaboration with The Texas Observer and the Portland Press Herald, obtained, published and analyzed 40 grant proposals from SPN regular member organizations. The grant proposals sought funding through SPN from the Searle Freedom Trust. According to The Guardian, the proposals documented a coordinated strategy across 34 states, "a blueprint for the conservative agenda in 2014." The reports described the grant proposals in six states as suggesting campaigns designed to cut pay to state government employees; oppose public sector collective bargaining; reduce public sector services in education and healthcare; promote school vouchers; oppose efforts to combat greenhouse gas emissions; reduce or eliminate income and sales taxes; and study a proposed block grant reform to Medicare.

Political influence
In 2006, three former presidents of SPN member organizations were serving as Republicans in the United States House of Representatives: Mike Pence of Indiana, Jeff Flake of Arizona, and Tom Tancredo of Colorado. National Review described them as having "used SPN organizations as political springboards."

SPN introduced model legislation for state legislators to implement on the state level to undermine the Affordable Care Act. The organization also pushed for states not to expand Medicaid.

Finances

SPN is a 501(c)(3) nonprofit organization. Its independently audited 2013 Internal Revenue Service Form 990 showed $8 million in revenue and $8.4 million in expenditures, of which $1.3 million was used for grants and payments to other organizations. The organization received a Charity Navigator score of 88 out of 100 in its most recent evaluation.

In 2013, Sharp told Politico that like most nonprofits, SPN keeps its donors private and voluntary. In 2011, Mother Jones reported that SPN is largely funded by donations from foundations, including the Lovett and Ruth Peters Foundation, the Castle Rock Foundation, and the Bradley Foundation. A 2013 article by The Guardian said that SPN received funding from the Koch brothers, Philip Morris, Kraft Foods and GlaxoSmithKline. Other corporate donors to SPN have included Facebook, Microsoft, AT&T, Time Warner Cable, Verizon, and Comcast. Between 2008 and 2013, SPN received $10 million from Donors Trust, a nonprofit donor-advised fund. In 2011, the approximately $2 million investment from Donors Trust accounted for about 40% of annual revenue.

Activities

SPN provides grant funding to its member organizations for start-up costs and program operating expenses. In 2011, SPN granted $60,000 in start-up funds to the Foundation for Government Accountability, a free market think tank based in Naples, Florida. SPN also provides practical support to its members, who meet each year at SPN conferences. SPN member organizations exchange ideas and provide training and other support for each other. A spokesperson for the progressive advocacy group People for the American Way said in 2008 that SPN trained its member organizations to run like business franchises. In a 2013 statement to The New Yorker, SPN president Sharp denied that SPN was a franchise and said that member organizations were free to select their own staff and priorities.

SPN is a member of the American Legislative Exchange Council (ALEC), an organization that drafts and shares state-level model legislation for conservative causes, and ALEC is an associate member of SPN. SPN is among the sponsors of ALEC. A 2009 article in an SPN newsletter encouraged SPN members to join ALEC, and many SPN members are also members of ALEC. ALEC is "SPN's sister organisation," according to The Guardian.

SPN member think tanks aided the Tea Party movement by supplying rally speakers and intellectual ammunition.

Member organizations
As of 2015, SPN had a membership of 65 think tanks and hundreds of affiliated organizations in all 50 states. Membership in SPN is by invitation only and is limited to independently incorporated 501(c)(3) organizations that are "dedicated to advancing market-oriented public policy solutions." The SPN membership program consists of affiliate and associate organizations. While affiliate members are state-based, associate members are national in scope and are not necessarily focused on a single state. According to Politico, SPN's associate members include a "who’s who of conservative organizations," including the Cato Institute, Heritage Foundation, Americans for Prosperity Foundation, FreedomWorks, Americans for Tax Reform, and American Legislative Exchange Council. In 2011, SPN and its regular member organizations received combined total revenues of $83.2 million, according to a 2013 analysis of their federal tax filings by the liberal watchdog group Center for Media and Democracy.

Affiliates
Regular members are described as "full-service think tanks" operating independently within their respective states.
 Alabama: Alabama Policy Institute
 Alaska: Alaska Policy Forum
 Arizona: Goldwater Institute 
 Arkansas: Advance Arkansas Institute, Arkansas Policy Foundation 
 California: California Policy Center, Pacific Research Institute 
 Colorado:  Independence Institute 
 Connecticut: Yankee Institute for Public Policy 
 Delaware: Caesar Rodney Institute 
 Florida: Foundation for Government Accountability, James Madison Institute 
 Georgia: Georgia Center for Opportunity, Georgia Public Policy Foundation
 Hawaii: Grassroot Institute
 Idaho: Idaho Freedom Foundation
 Illinois: Illinois Policy Institute
 Indiana: Indiana Policy Review Foundation
 Iowa: Iowans for Tax Relief Foundation
 Kansas: Kansas Policy Institute
 Kentucky: Bluegrass Institute for Public Policy Solutions, Pegasus Institute
 Louisiana: Pelican Institute for Public Policy
 Maine: Maine Policy Institute
 Maryland: Maryland Public Policy Institute
 Massachusetts: Pioneer Institute 
 Michigan: Mackinac Center for Public Policy 
 Minnesota: Center of the American Experiment, Freedom Foundation of Minnesota
 Mississippi: Empower Mississippi, Mississippi Center for Public Policy
 Missouri: Show-Me Institute 
 Montana: Frontier Institute
 Nebraska: Platte Institute for Economic Research 
 Nevada: Nevada Policy Research Institute
 New Hampshire: Josiah Bartlett Center for Public Policy, Granite Institute
 New Jersey: Garden State Initiative
 New Mexico: Rio Grande Foundation 
 New York: Empire Center for Public Policy
 North Carolina: John Locke Foundation
 North Dakota: Rough Rider Policy Center
 Ohio: Buckeye Institute
 Oklahoma: Oklahoma Council of Public Affairs
 Oregon: Cascade Policy Institute 
 Pennsylvania: Commonwealth Foundation for Public Policy Alternatives 
 Rhode Island: Rhode Island Center for Freedom and Prosperity
 South Carolina: Palmetto Promise Institute, South Carolina Policy Council
 South Dakota: Great Plains Public Policy Institute
 Tennessee: Beacon Center of Tennessee
 Texas: Texas Public Policy Foundation
 Utah: Libertas Institute, Sutherland Institute 
 Vermont: Ethan Allen Institute 
 Virginia: Thomas Jefferson Institute, Virginia Institute for Public Policy
 Washington: Freedom Foundation, Washington Policy Center
 West Virginia: Cardinal Institute for West Virginia Policy
 Wisconsin: MacIver Institute for Public Policy, Badger Institute, Wisconsin Institute for Law and Liberty, Institute for Reforming Government
 Wyoming: Wyoming Liberty Group

Roe Awards

The Roe Award, first presented in 1992, is named after SPN founder Thomas A. Roe. It honors individuals who have successfully promoted free market philosophy while displaying innovation and accomplishment in public policy. The physical statue is an eagle, "a symbol of liberty with courage and conviction necessary for its preservation".

Overton Award
The Overton Award was created in 2003 after the death of Joseph P. Overton at age 43. Overton is known for the idea, posthumously called the Overton window, about the range of policies politically acceptable to the mainstream at a given time.

The award is given to chief operating officers or executive vice presidents of non-profit free market organizations who demonstrate the personal qualities that Overton possessed. These include humility in supporting their peers, leadership that builds a team, and developing strategies that magnify the ideas and influence of their organization. As of 2022, the award had been given five times.

See also

 American Legislative Exchange Council
 Americans for Prosperity Foundation
 Americans for Tax Reform
 Cato Institute
 Foundation for Government Accountability
 FreedomWorks
 The Heritage Foundation
 Tea Party movement

References

External links
 
 YouTube website
 Nonprofit Explorer – State Policy Network, archive of federal disclosures maintained by ProPublica

Conservative organizations in the United States
Organizations established in 1992
Political and economic think tanks in the United States
Non-profit organizations based in Arlington, Virginia
1992 establishments in Virginia